Morris David Reiss ( – March 17, 1949) was an American lawyer and politician from New York.

Life 
Reiss was born around 1887. He resided in his Assembly district in New York City since around 1903.

Reiss began attending the New York Law School in 1905. He was admitted to the bar in 1910 and practiced law in his office at 261 Broadway. He was involved in settlement work for ten years. In 1920, he was elected to the New York State Assembly as a Republican with Democratic support in New York County's 8th District, defeating Socialist Louis Waldman. He served in the Assembly in 1921. He lost the 1921 re-election to Democrat Henry O. Kahan. In 1923, he was named Assistant United States Attorney.

Reiss was a member of the New York County Lawyers' Association and the New York County Republican Committee. He was a director, officer, and counsel of the Jewish Home for Convalescents. He also served as its president, and in 1932 he was honored for serving with the Home for eighteen years.

Reiss died from falling or jumping from his room in the Pierrepont Hotel in Brooklyn on March 17, 1949. He was staying in the hotel since his sister, his last surviving relative, died in May 1948. He was buried in Mount Hebron Cemetery.

References

External links 
 The Political Graveyard

1880s births
1949 deaths
Year of birth uncertain
New York Law School alumni
20th-century American lawyers
Lawyers from New York City
Jewish American attorneys
Jewish American state legislators in New York (state)
Politicians from Manhattan
20th-century American politicians
Members of the New York State Assembly
Assistant United States Attorneys
Burials at Mount Hebron Cemetery (New York City)